Jane-Ling Wang is a distinguished professor of statistics at the University of California, Davis who studies dimension reduction, functional data analysis, and aging.

Education and career
Wang graduated from National Taiwan University in 1975 with a bachelor of arts degree in mathematics. She earned a master's of arts in mathematics in 1978 from the University of California, Berkeley, and in 1982, obtained a doctorate in statistics from the University of California, Berkeley; her dissertation, supervised by Lucien Le Cam, was Asymptotically Minimax Estimators for Distributions with Increasing Failure Rate.
After starting her faculty career at the University of Iowa, she moved to Davis in 1984. She chaired the statistics department at Davis from 1999 to 2003.

Awards and honors
Wang is a fellow of the American Statistical Association and of the Institute of Mathematical Statistics. She won the Outstanding Service Award of the International Chinese Statistical Association in 2010. She is the 2016 winner of the Gottfried E. Noether Senior Scholar Award of the American Statistical Association. In 2022 she was elected to the Academia Sinica.

References

External links
Home page

Year of birth missing (living people)
Living people
American women statisticians
University of California, Berkeley alumni
University of Iowa faculty
University of California, Davis faculty
Fellows of the American Statistical Association
Fellows of the Institute of Mathematical Statistics
21st-century American women
Members of Academia Sinica
Taiwanese statisticians
National Taiwan University alumni
American statisticians